Norman D. Daly (August 9, 1911 - April 2, 2008), was an American artist who created the fictional ancient Civilization of Llhuros along with hundreds of its artifacts. His work on The Civilization of Llhuros starting in the mid 1960s makes him the pioneering practitioner of an art genre now known as fictive archaeology.

Family and Education
Daly was born and raised in Pittsburgh, Pennsylvania, the youngest of seven children of Rose (Owens) Daly and James A. Daly. His elementary and secondary education combined elements of the Catholic and the secular. He was a night school art student at the Carnegie Institute of Technology  (1932–34) before going on to major in art at the University of Colorado (BFA 1937). After a fellowship year in Paris (1937–38), he received his MA from Ohio State University (1940). His first teaching position was at Oberlin College (1940–41).  Daly also undertook post-graduate work in art history at The Institute of Fine Arts, New York University while teaching at Douglass College.

Daly married Helen O. Gebbie in 1942, and they had two sons, David and Nicholas.

Early career
In 1942, Daly joined the Department of Art at Cornell University in Ithaca, New York, where he taught drawing, painting, materials and methods, and elements of design. He became Professor of Art in 1958 and retired in 1976, but continued to teach as an emeritus professor until 1999. Beginning with his undergraduate years in Boulder, Norman Daly took inspiration for his early paintings from the American Southwest and Native American art. He began exhibiting these paintings in the mid-1940s and his work as a professional artist continued throughout the 1950s. By 1960 his interests broadened to the three-dimensional, including found objects, assemblages and marble carvings.

The Civilization of Llhuros
Daly became interested in the relation of art to anthropology and archaeology, and this new approach led him to create the imaginary civilization of Llhuros. He situated Llhuros in Asia Minor just east of the Iron Age kingdom of Lydia (now western Turkey). The Civilization of Llhuros is the title for the collection that Daly went on to present as archaeological artifacts of Llhuros. Included are frescoes, architectural fragments, vessels, ritual objects, jewelry, games, and musical and scientific instruments. Llhuros is composed of more than 150 works of visual art, ranging from a matchbox-size scientific instrument to an 8' by 36' temple wall in bas-relief. Daly also created works of Llhuroscian poetry and collaborated with musicians and actors in the studios of inventor Robert Moog to record Llhuroscian music. Finally, Daly invented an elaborate world of scholars and commentators who voiced their opinions on many aspects of Llhuros.
In 1972, the Andrew Dickson White Museum of Art at Cornell mounted the first exhibition of The Civilization of Llhuros. The exhibition catalog appears to be the catalog of an archaeological exhibition, with illustrations and detailed technical and historical information. This combination of an invented archaeology together with skillful efforts to make the project appear to be actual history marks The Civilization of Llhuros as an exemplar of fictive art (also known as superfiction).
The Civilization of Llhuros was widely exhibited in the United States in the early 1970s. It received its largest presentation, along with Projekt '74, at the Roman-Germanic Museum in Cologne in 1974. After 1974, Daly moved on to other projects. Significant aspects of Llhuros were again shown at the Herbert F. Johnson Museum at Cornell in 2004. Llhuros experienced a renaissance beginning in 2017 when a sampling of objects was included in the Plurivers exhibition at  Panacée in Montpellier, France. Following that, in 2019 a full installation of "The Civilization of Llhuros" was featured at the Istanbul Biennial. Both exhibitions were under the direction of the renowned French curator and critic Nicolas Bourriaud.

In 2021, Antoinette LaFarge, a fictive practitioner herself, published Sting in the Tale: Art, Hoax and Provocation. In this pioneering study, LaFarge described The Civilization of Llhuros as the prototype of the genre of fictive art.

Photo Gallery

References

External links
 Norman Daly website
 The Civilization of Llhuros website
 The Civilization of Llhuros catalogs and posters

1911 births
2008 deaths
20th-century American artists
American male artists
Artists from Pittsburgh
University of Colorado alumni
Ohio State University alumni
Cornell University faculty
20th-century American male artists